This article is about the particular significance of the year 2009 to Wales and its people.

Incumbents
First Minister
Rhodri Morgan (until 9 December)
Carwyn Jones
Secretary of State for Wales
Paul Murphy (until 5 June)
Peter Hain
Archbishop of Wales – Barry Morgan, Bishop of Llandaff
Archdruid of the National Eisteddfod of Wales
Dic Jones (outgoing)
Jim Parc Nest (incoming)

Events
1 January
The Archbishop of Canterbury, Dr Rowan Williams, broadcasts a New Year message on BBC television.  He warns against losing sight of our "real treasure" and says: "Our hearts will be in a very bad way if they're focused only on the state of our finances."
Record numbers of swimmers participate in New Year's Day charity swims at Amroth, Saundersfoot and Abersoch.
2 January - Dame Tanni Grey-Thompson denies having criticised the failure to include all UK Paralympic gold medal-winners in the UK New Year Honours List.
9 January - The UK Prime Minister, Gordon Brown, visits south Wales as part of a 3-day tour of the regions.
11 January - Eight rescuers are injured as four mountain rescue teams help bring two climbers to safety from the summit of Snowdon.
15 January - Welsh Conservative Assembly Members issue an announcement saying that they give their unanimous support to Nick Bourne as leader of the Assembly group.
19 January - The Cardiff International Sports Stadium opens, replacing the old Cardiff Athletics Stadium
22 January - After having been the only police force in the UK to record an increase in crime during 2007-2008, South Wales Police witnesses a 4% drop in crime in its area, according to the latest British Crime Survey.
26 January - Corus announces the loss of up to 1,100 jobs at its plants in Wales and the mothballing of the Llanwern hot strip mill.
2 February - After a 24-hour search, the Llanberis mountain rescue team recovers the bodies of two brothers from south-west England who went missing on Snowdon on 31 January.
8 February - At the 51st Grammy Awards in Los Angeles, Best Pop Vocal Album goes to Duffy for Rockferry.
11 February - Four people are killed in a mid-air collision between two light aircraft near Kenfig.  They are two female air cadets from Rhondda, aged 13 and 14, and two RAF instructors.
18 February
Duffy wins the Best Female and British Breakthrough Act awards at the 2009 BRIT Awards; her album Rockferry wins Best Album.
The inquest opens into the Kenfig air crash of 11 February.
21 February - Rescuers have to abseil  down a sheer rock face in the dark to rescue a team of three climbers stuck on Snowdon.
6 March - Boxer Joe Calzaghe wins a court action against his former manager Frank Warren, claiming £2 million in unpaid fees.
13 March - The Hoover Company ceases washing machine production at Merthyr Tydfil.
1 June - ftrmetro Swansea bus rapid transit system begins operation.
12 June - Hafod Eryri at the summit of Snowdon is opened.
27 June - An 11-mile stretch of the Llangollen Canal, including the Pontcysyllte Aqueduct, is designated a UNESCO World Heritage Site.
21 July - The first race meeting is held at Ffos Las racecourse, the first new National Hunt racecourse to be built in the United Kingdom for 80 years.
22 July - Official opening of the new Cardiff City Stadium, Wales' 2nd largest stadium, when Cardiff City F.C. drew against Glasgow's Celtic F.C.
31 July - The Indesit Company ceases washing machine production at Kinmel Park, Bodelwyddan.
1 August - The National Eisteddfod of Wales opens at Bala.
8 August - The first test of the Ashes 2009 series, seeing England against Australia in Cricket, begins at Cardiff's SWALEC Stadium.
12 August - Wales begins the process of digital switchover with the turning off of parts of the analogue signal from the Kilvey Hill transmitter.
29 September - On his 70th birthday, Rhodri Morgan announces that he will stand down as First Minister in December.
22 October - The St David's Centre in Cardiff re-opens as one of the largest shopping centres in the United Kingdom after its multimillion-pound extension and the reconstruction of the surrounding area.
November - Mererid Hopwood, the first woman to be nominated for the position of Archdruid of the National Eisteddfod, withdraws her name from consideration, leaving T. James Jones as the only candidate.
12 November - Health & Social Services Minister Edwina Hart declines a request by Liberal Democrat Kirsty Williams to review how £1 billion has been spent on NHS services in Wales.
13 November - The agreement A New Understanding is signed by representatives of the Welsh Assembly Government and the Welsh Local Government Association.
18 November - A report by the All Wales Convention finds that public opinion is narrowly in favour of increasing the powers of the Welsh Assembly.
21 November
Dannie Abse receives the Wilfred Owen Poetry Award.
Pride In Barry announces the planned placement of a Blue Plaque on 19 Porth Y Castell, Barry, in memory of boxer Jack Petersen.
9 December - Carwyn Jones takes office as First Minister for Wales.
16 December - The Afan Lido leisure complex in Port Talbot is badly damaged by fire.
Nearby residents are evacuated as the cause is investigated.

Arts and literature

Awards
Glyndŵr Award – Llŷr Williams
National Eisteddfod of Wales: Chair – withheld
National Eisteddfod of Wales: Crown – Ceri Wyn Jones
National Eisteddfod of Wales: Drama Medal – Dyfed Edwards
National Eisteddfod of Wales: Fine Art Medal – Elfyn Lewis
National Eisteddfod of Wales: Prose Medal – Siân Melangell Dafydd
Gwobr Goffa Daniel Owen – Fflur Dafydd
Wales Book of the Year:
English language: Deborah Kay Davies – Grace, Tamar and Laszlo the Beautiful
Welsh language: William Owen Roberts – Petrograd
Kyffin Art Prize: Louisa Theunissen
Cân i Gymru: Elfed Morgan Morris – "Gofidiau"
BBC Cardiff Singer of the World competition:
Main Prize – Ekaterina Scherbachenko
Song Prize – Jan Martinik

New books

Welsh language
Robat Gruffudd - A Gymri Di Gymru?
Lloyd Jones - Y Dŵr

English language
Emyr Humphreys - The Woman at the Window
Siân James - Return to Hendre Ddu
Nigel Owens - Half Time
Malcolm Pryce - From Aberystwyth with Love
John Powell Ward - The Last Green Year

Music

Classical
Catrin Finch - Goldberg Variations (transcribed for harp)
Rhydian - O Fortuna

Albums
Derwyddon Dr Gonzo - Stonk!
Only Men Aloud! - Band of Brothers

Singles
Vanessa Jenkins and Bryn West - "Barry Islands in the Stream" featuring Sir Tom Jones and Robin Gibb

Theatre
May - National Theatre Wales, an English-language theatre company, is established with a grant of £3 million.

Film
Underworld: Rise of the Lycans, starring Michael Sheen

Broadcasting

Welsh-language TV
 Caerdydd
S4C launches a new bilingual rugby website

English-language TV
Coal House
Doctor Who - David Tennant films his final scenes as The Doctor in Cardiff.
Gavin & Stacey - series 3

Sport
January - Simon Lawson of Cardiff wins the 28th annual Richard Burton 10 km run in a time of 31 minutes.
21 March - Wales are narrowly defeated by Ireland to finish third overall in the 2009 Six Nations Championship (rugby union).
June - The first race meeting is held at the newly constructed Ffos Las racecourse.
28 December - Blackwood-reared Dream Alliance wins the Welsh Grand National.
BBC Wales Sports Personality of the Year - Ryan Giggs

Births
11 January - Dexter Lloyd Henson, son of Charlotte Church and Gavin Henson

Deaths
9 January - T. Llew Jones, writer, 93
10 January - Eluned Phillips, writer, 94
13 January - Dai Llewellyn, socialite, 62
22 January - Vic Crowe, footballer, 76
9 February
Gareth Alban Davies, academic, 82
Reg Davies, footballer, 79
10 February - Gerwyn Williams, rugby union footballer, 84
14 February - Sir Bernard Ashley, entrepreneur, 82
19 February - Ian L. Jenkins, former Surgeon General of the British Armed Forces, 64
26 February - Jackie Bowen, Welsh rugby union and rugby league footballer, 93
2 March - Gerard Morgan-Grenville, environmentalist, 77
12 March - Huw Thomas, broadcaster, lawyer and politician, 81
22 March - Emyr Price, historian, 64
23 March - Geoff Holmes, cricketer, 50
12 April - John Maddox, biologist, 83
22 April - Cliff Curvis, British and Commonwealth boxing champion, 81
May - Ralph Morgan, Welsh rugby union and rugby league footballer, 88?
14 May - Ken Hollyman, footballer, 86
16 May - Einion Evans, poet, 82
31 May - Brian Edrich, former Glamorgan cricket coach, 86
5 June - Haydn Tanner, Wales international rugby union footballer, 92
19 June - Major Sean Birchall, soldier, 33 (killed on active service)
6 July - Bleddyn Williams, rugby union footballer, 86
11 July - Geraint Owen, actor and politician, 43
27 July - Aeronwy Thomas, writer and daughter of Dylan Thomas, 66
18 August - Dic Jones, poet and archdruid, 75
28 August - Noel Jones, Anglican bishop, 76
6 September - David Glyndwr Tudor Williams, barrister and academic, 78
9 September - Stanley Cornwell Lewis, artist, 103
7 October - Helen Watts, operatic contralto, 81
10 October - Sir Bryan Hopkin, economist, 94
11 October - Patrick Hannan, radio and TV journalist, 68
17 October - Douglas Blackwell, actor, 85
20 October - Hubert Rees, actor
12 November - Orig Williams, wrestler and TV presenter, 78
16 December - T. G. H. James, Egyptologist, 86
30 December - Maldwyn Evans, bowls champion, 72

See also 
 2009 in Northern Ireland

References